Larissa Evangelista (born ) is a Brazilian group rhythmic  gymnast. She represented Brazil in international competitions. She competed at world championships, including at the 2005 World Rhythmic Gymnastics Championships in Baku, Azerbaijan.

References

1988 births
Living people
Brazilian rhythmic gymnasts
Place of birth missing (living people)